Vilko is an Icelandic manufacturer of soups and baking products, headquartered in Blönduós, Iceland.

Vilko's factory in Blönduós was destroyed in a fire in October, 2004, but operations were subsequently restored in a new building, and production resumed in November 2004.

Vilko's soup production was started in Kópavogur, Iceland in 1969 by Jón Ingimarsson. The company later diversified into baking products. Before starting the Vilko soup brand, Vilko was a chemical manufacturer.

Products (incomplete)

Soups
 Vilko kakósúpa
 Vilko sætsúpa
 Vilko ávaxtagrautur
 Vilko bláberjasúpa
 Vilko apríkósusúpa)

Baking products
 Vilko sjónvarpskaka
 Vilko skúffukaka
 Vilko vöfflumix
 Vilko pönnukökumix

References

External links 
 Official website

Food and drink companies of Iceland
Food and drink companies established in 1949
Icelandic brands
1949 establishments in Iceland